Bessie Barriscale (born Elizabeth Barry Scale, June 9, 1884June 30, 1965) was an American actress who gained fame on the stage and in silent films.

Early life 
Barriscale was born Elizabeth Barry Scale in Hoboken, New Jersey, to Irish immigrants from County Cork. Her father came to the United States with a London company that presented The Lights of London. Her cousins were actresses Edith and Mabel Taliaferro. At age 5 she debuted on stage with James A. Hearn.

Career 
As a young woman, Barriscale was the Proctor Stock Company's ingenue at the Fifth Avenue Theatre in New York, after which she portrayed Madge in In Old Kentucky for two years. In 1902, she married actor Sumner Gard. She did not tell her parents until January 1, 1903. That was followed by two years as Lovey Mary in Mrs. Wiggs of the Cabbage Patch. She became leading woman with the Belasco Stock Company in Los Angeles after performing for a year in Belasco's Rose of the Rancho. She went on to portray Luna in The Bird of Paradise and to have the lead in We Are Seven. In the first decade of the 20th century Barriscale worked in the legitimate theater on Broadway and on the road as movies were not popular for stage actors yet. 

Barriscale began her film career in 1913, debuting on-screen in Lasky Picture Company's Rose of the Rancho. She worked intensively for New York Motion Picture Company and Triangle Film Corporation (among other studios) until she announced her retirement in the early 1930s. In 1917, she had her own production company, the Bessie Barriscale Feature Company. Barriscale announced the formation at a news conference on May 1, 1917. Plans called for the company to produce six to eight features each year. Another new company, Paralta Plays, was designated to distribute the films. James Young was hired as one of three directors for Barriscale's new company.

In 1918, Barriscale was contracted by J.L. Frothingham of B.B. Features and the Roberson Cole Company to make 16 films. B.B. Features was an Arizona corporation. The movies were to be completed, produced, and delivered by January 21, 1921. At this time, Miss Barriscale's managers insured her life for a half million dollars against eventualities. The total cost of the features totaled more than $1,000,000.
Barriscale was enthusiastic about William Shakespeare and wanted to bring one of his plays to the screen. The actress was also an excellent swimmer. In The Woman Michael Married (1919), she was featured in a movie adapted from a novel by Annette Kellermann. Barriscale went so far as to hire a swimming and diving instructor and took lessons in Venice, California. A 90-foot pool was constructed at Brunton Studios where the scenes were shot. The film was directed by Henry Kolker.

In 1919, she traveled with her husband—actor, director, and film producer—Howard C. Hickman and their small son on a world tour. They anticipated producing motion pictures during their journey and traveled with a cameraman.

In 1921, Barriscale came east to play in The Skirt. The play was to travel to Philadelphia and Boston after opening in Washington, D.C.. Later the production appeared in New York City. In prior years, Barriscale participated in plays for the Belasco Theater in Los Angeles and once appeared in Belasco productions, notably Bird of Paradise written by Richard Walton Tully. She played a princess named Luana. During the early years, Barriscale was in vaudeville, with two-a-day, three-a-day, and even four-a-day performances not uncommon.

Actor Jackie Coogan and his parents purchased the home of Bessie Barriscale in Pellisier Square, Los Angeles in February 1922. The residence was valued at $45,000.

Barriscale returned to the stage in Women Go On Forever. She had been married 21 years and had a son age 20 at this time. The production opened at the Hollywood Music Box in March 1928. She played a "housewife type," and confessed to having rehearsed for the role in a gingham dress she took from the wardrobe of her home in Santa Monica, California. Her feet were slightly smaller than her shoes. She said she had been working at home for several years and had just learned to cook.

Death 
Barriscale died in Kentfield, California on June 30, 1965. She is interred next to her husband, Howard C. Hickman, at the Mount Tamalpais Cemetery in San Rafael, California.

Honors 
For her contributions to the film industry, Barriscale received a motion pictures star on the Hollywood Walk of Fame in 1960. Her star is located at 6652 Hollywood Boulevard.

Filmography 

 The Gambler's Pal (1913), short
 Eileen of Erin (1913), short
 The Bells of Austi (1914), short
 The Making of Bobby Burnit (1914), short
 Ready Money (1914)
 Rose of the Rancho (1914)
 The Devil (1915)
 The Cup of Life (1915)
 The Reward (1915), short
 The Mating (1915)
 The Golden Claw (1915)
 The Painted Soul (1915)
 The Green Swamp (1916)
 Honor's Altar (1916)
 Bullets and Brown Eyes (1916)
 The Last Act (1916)
 Not My Sister (1916)
 The Sorrows of Love (1916)
 The Payment (1916)
 Home (1916)
 Plain Jane (1916)
 A Corner in Colleens (1916)
 The Snarl (1917)
 Bawbs o' the Blue Ridge (1917)
 The Hater of Men (1917)
 Borrowed Plumage (1917)
 Wooden Shoes (1917)
 Those Who Pay (1917)
 Madam Who? (1918)
 The Cast-Off (1918)
 Within the Cup (1918)
 Blindfolded (1918)
 Rose o' Paradise (1918)
 Patriotism (1918)
 Maid o' the Storm (1918)
 The White Lie (1918)
 The Heart of Rachael (1918)
 Two-Gun Betty (1918)
 All of a Sudden Norma (1919)
 A Trick of Fate (1919)
 Hearts Asleep (1919)
 Josselyn's Wife (1919)
 Tangled Threads (1919)
 The Woman Michael Married (1919)
 Her Purchase Price (1919)
 Kitty Kelly, M.D. (1919)
 Beckoning Roads (1919)
 The Luck of Geraldine Laird (1920)
 A Woman Who Understood (1920)
 The Notorious Mrs. Sands (1920)
 Life's Twist (1920)
 The Broken Gate (1920)
 The Breaking Point (1921)
 Show Folks (1928)
 Secrets (1933)
 Bondage (1933)
 Above the Clouds (1933)
 Beloved (1934)
 The Man Who Reclaimed His Head (1934)

References 
Citations

Bibliography

External links 

 
 
 
 Silent era portrait of Bessie Barriscale
 Bessie Barriscale on Women Film Pioneers Project

American silent film actresses
American film actresses
Actresses from New Jersey
People from Hoboken, New Jersey
1884 births
1965 deaths
20th-century American actresses
American stage actresses
Women film pioneers